Bobo Eina Island is an island in Papua New Guinea, part of the Calvados Chain within the Louisiade Archipelago. It is located near Bagaman Island. 
It is used as a fishermen camp for the men of Bagaman.
In recent years, Bagaman islanders use Bobo Eina for gardening yams, and have also established a pig farm on the island.

References

Islands of Milne Bay Province
Louisiade Archipelago